This is a list of Iranian football transfers for the 2015–16 winter transfer window. Transfers of Iran Pro League is listed. 
Transfer window will open on 23 December 2015 and close on 19 January 2016.

Players limits

The Iranian Football Clubs who participate in 2015–16 Iranian football different levels are allowed to have up to maximum 35 players in their player lists, which will be categorized in the following groups:
 Up to maximum 18 adult (without any age limit) players
 Up to maximum 9 under-23 players (i.e. the player whose birth is after 1 January 1993).
 Up to maximum 8 under-21 players (i.e. the player whose birth is after 1 January 1995).

Iran Pro League

Rules and regulations 
According to Iran Football Federation rules for 2015–16 Iran Pro League, each Football Club is allowed to take up to maximum 6 new Iranian player from the other clubs who already played in the 2014–15 Iran Pro League season. In addition to these six new players, each club is allowed to take up to maximum 4 non-Iranian new players (at least one of them should be Asian) and up to 3 players from Free agent (who did not play in 2015–16 Iran Pro League season or doesn't list in any 2015–16 League after season's start) during the season. In addition to these players, the clubs are also able to take some new under-23 and under-21 years old players, if they have some free place in these categories in their player lists. Under-23 players should sign in transfer window but under-21 can be signed during the first mid-season. For the first time, in 2015–16 season clubs are allowed to sign Japanese player without foreign players (3+1) limit.

Esteghlal 

In:

Out:

Esteghlal Ahvaz 

In:

Out:

Esteghlal Khuzestan 

In:

Out:

Foolad 

In:

Out:

Gostaresh Foolad 

In:

Out:

Malavan 

In:

Out:

Naft Tehran 

In:

Out:

Padideh 

In:

Out:

Persepolis 

In:

Out:

Rah Ahan Yazdan 

In:

 

Out:

Saba Qom 

In:

Out:

Saipa 

In:

Out:

Sepahan 

In:

Out:

Siahjamegan 

In:

Out:

Tractor Sazi 

In:

Out:

Zob Ahan 

In:

Out:

Azadegan League

Rules and regulations 
According to Iran Football Federation rules for 2015–16 Azadegan League each club is allowed to take up to 3 players from Free agent during the season. In addition to these players, the clubs are also able to take some new under-23 and under-21 years old players, if they have some free place in these categories in their player lists. Under-23 players should sign in transfer window but under-21 can be signed during the first mid-season. Clubs in Azadegan League can not sign any foreign player. There is no limit for signing Iranian players.

Aluminium Arak 

In:

Out:

Aluminium Hormozgan 

In:

Out:

Damash 

In:

Out:

Fajr Sepasi 

In:

Out:

Foolad Yazd 

In:

Out:

Giti Pasand Isfahan 

In:

Out:

Gol Gohar Sirjan 

In:

Out:

Iranjavan 

In:

Out:

Kheybar Khorramabad 

In:

Out:

Khoneh Be Khoneh Mazandaran 

In:

Out:

Machine Sazi 

In:

Out:

Mes Kerman 

In:

Out:

Mes Rafsanjan 

In:

Out:

Naft Masjed Soleyman 

In:

Out:

Nassaji 

In:

Out:

Parseh Tehran 

In:

Out:

PAS Hamedan 

In:

Out:

Paykan 

In:

Out:

Sanat Naft 

In:

Out:

Shahrdari Ardabil 

In:

Out:

Notes and references

Football transfers winter 2015–16
2015
Transfers